In the design of radio broadcast systems, especially television systems, the desired-to-undesired channel ratio (D/U ratio) is a measure of the strength of the broadcast signal for a particular channel compared with the strength of undesired broadcast signals in the same channel (e.g. from other nearby transmitting stations).

See also
 Signal-to-noise ratio

References
 ATSC A/74 compliance and tuner design implications; eetimes.com

Engineering ratios
Noise (electronics)